Fistuliporidae is an extinct family of bryozoans within the order Cystoporida. Members of this family have lived from the early Ordovician to the late Triassic period.

Genera 

 †Acantholunaria 
 †Buskopora 
 †Canutrypa 
 †Cassianopora 
 †Cheilotrypa 
 †Cliocystiramus 
 †Cliotrypa 
 †Coelocaulis 
 †Curvipora 
 †Cycloidotrypa 
 †Cyclotrypa 
 †Cystiramus 
 †Cystitrypa 
 †Cystomeson 
 †Diamesopora 
 †Duncanoclema 
 †Dybowskiella 
 †Eofistulotrypa 
 †Eridopora 
 †Fistulacanta 
 †Fistuliphragma 
 †Fistuliphragmoides 
 †Fistulipora 
 †Fistuliporella 
 †Fistuliporidra 
 †Fistuliramus 
 †Fistulocladia 
 †Fistulotrypa 
 †Kasakhstanella 
 †Lichenotrypa 
 †Odontotrypa 
 †Parametelipora 
 †Pholidopora 
 †Physallidopora 
 †Pileotrypa 
 †Pinacotrypa 
 †Realeksella 
 †Selenopora 
 †Stellatoides 
 †Strotopora 
 †Velbertopora 
 †Xiapora

References 

Cystoporida
Prehistoric bryozoans
Bryozoan families
Paleozoic invertebrates
Mesozoic invertebrates
Ordovician first appearances
Triassic extinctions